Thomas Gunnar Nordahl (born 24 May 1946) is a Swedish former professional footballer who played as a forward. He is also a former manager.

He played his club football for Degerfors IF, Örebro SK, R.S.C. Anderlecht, and BK Forward during a career that spanned between 1964 and 1980. A full international between 1967 and 1975, he won 15 caps and scored 5 goals for the Sweden national team. He represented Sweden at the 1970 FIFA World Cup. After his playing career he worked as a manager with BK Forward, Sandvikens IF, Motala AIF, and IFK Norrköping.

He is the son of former professional footballer Gunnar Nordahl.

Club career
Nordahl made his debut in the Allsvenskan in 1964 for Degerfors IF when he was 17 years old. A year later, he moved to Örebro SK and became a key player there. He played 77 matches for the Swedish side and scored 41 goals. 1968 he moved to the Italian club Juventus, who had finished third in Serie A during the 1967–68 season. However, shortly after Nordahl signed the contract, the Serie A issued a ban which stopped all clubs from bringing in foreign players. Nordahl was contracted with Juventus but couldn't play because of this ban. This forced Juventus to loan him out to Belgian side R.S.C. Anderlecht. Nordahl stayed in Anderlecht for three years, until 1971; after those three years, his contract with Juventus ended, but the ban still had not been lifted. Nordahl left the club without playing a match for them and went to his old club Örebro. He played there for 7 years between 1971 and 1978, making 175 appearances and scoring 65 goals, resulting in a total of 252 appearances and 106 goals for the club. In 1979 (the season began 1980) he went to another Swedish club, BK Forward, and played 45 matches and scored 21 goals. In 1980, an injury forced Nordahl to quit playing football and the age of 34.

International career
Nordahl made 15 international appearances for the Sweden national team between 1967 and 1975, and scored 5 goals. He also made 15 appearances for the Swedish youth teams. Nordahl was included in the Swedish squad for the 1970 FIFA World Cup in Mexico.

Coaching career
Following his retirement from professional football, Nordahl went on to coach a number of Swedish clubs, including BK Forward, Sandvikens IF, Motala AIF, and IFK Norrköping.

Career statistics

International 

 Scores and results list Sweden's goal tally first, score column indicates score after each Nordahl goal.

Honours

Player 
RSC Anderlecht

 Belgian First Division: 1967–68
 Inter-Cities Fairs Cup: 1969-70 (runners-up)
Individual

 Stor Grabb: 1975

References

External links

Career stats

Living people
1946 births
Association football midfielders
Swedish footballers
Sweden international footballers
1970 FIFA World Cup players
Degerfors IF players
Örebro SK players
Juventus F.C. players
R.S.C. Anderlecht players
Swedish football managers
Expatriate footballers in Belgium
Expatriate footballers in Italy
IFK Norrköping managers
Sandvikens IF managers
BK Forward players
Belgian Pro League players
Allsvenskan players
Sportspeople from Norrköping
Footballers from Östergötland County